"Knockin' on Heaven's Door" is a 1973 song written by Bob Dylan.

Knocking on Heaven's Door may also refer to:

Knockin' on Heaven's Door, a 1974 album by Arthur Louis
"Knockin' on Heaven's Door", a 1996 episode of the TV series Neon Genesis Evangelion
"Knockin' on Heaven's Door", a 1997 song by Avalon from their album A Maze of Grace
Knockin' on Heaven's Door (1997 film)
Knocking on Heaven's Door (2014 film)
Cowboy Bebop: Knockin' on Heaven's Door, a 2001 Japanese anime film
Knocking On Heaven's Door, a 2009 documentary by Anthony Sherwood
Knocking on Heaven's Door (book), a book by Lisa Randall (2011)